Lasse Lind (born 1 March 1981) is a Finnish football midfielder who currently plays for FC Viikingit.

External links
B/ Player Profile

1981 births
Living people
Finnish footballers
Bonner SC players
Atlantis FC players
Expatriate footballers in Germany
Finnish expatriate footballers
Association football midfielders
Footballers from Helsinki
21st-century Finnish people